

The ASJA L2 was a Swedish biplane trainer aircraft built for the Swedish Air Force in the early 1930s. It was designated Ö 9 in that service. The fuselage was of fabric-covered, welded steel tube construction and accommodated the pilot and instructor in tandem open cockpits. The wings were fabric-covered wood and were of staggered, single bay layout.

Only two examples were built, one with wheels and the other with floats. The landplane served until written off in a crash in 1937 and the floatplane until made obsolete in 1940.

Operators

Swedish Air Force

Units using this aircraft
 Wing F 1 at Västerås
 Wing F 2 at Hägernäs

Specifications

References
 
 Military Aviation in Sweden (website)

1930s Swedish military trainer aircraft
Single-engined tractor aircraft
L2
Biplanes
Aircraft first flown in 1932